Giulia may refer to:

People
 Giulia (given name)
 Giulia (wrestler) (born 1994), English-born Italian-Japanese professional wrestler

Places 
Cappella Giulia, a chapel in St. Peter's Basilica, Rome
 Friuli-Venezia Giulia, one of the 20 regions of Italy
Friuli Venezia Giulia Airport, an airport near Trieste
 Il Quotidiano del Friuli Venezia Giulia, a free newspaper 2011–14
 Milano Santa Giulia, a green and residential district (quartiere) in Milan, Italy
 Santa Giulia (Brescia), Lombardy, a former monastery
 Santa Giulia, Lucca, a church
Valle Giulia, a valley near Rome
 Battle of Valle Giulia, a violent confrontation between demonstrators and police in 1968
 Fountain of Valle Giulia
Venezia Giulia, an area of southeastern Europe, today split among Croatia, Italy and Slovenia
 Venezia Giulia Police Force, operational 1945–1961
 Via Giulia, a street in the historic centre of Rome
 Santa Caterina da Siena a Via Giulia, a church on Via Giulia
Villa Giulia, Rome, home of the National Etruscan Museum
 Villa Giulia (Naples), a historic villa
 Villa Giulia (Palermo), a park
 Fontana del Genio a Villa Giulia, a fountain in Palermo

Transport 
Alfa Romeo Giulia, a large family car of the 1960s and 1970s
 Alfa Romeo Giulia TZ, a sports car manufactured between 1963 and 1967
 Alfa Romeo Giulia (952), a compact executive car introduced in 2016
 SS Santa Giulia, an Empire-class ship built in 1944, originally named Empire Bute

Film and television
 Disperatamente Giulia (Julia Forever), a 1989 Italian romance-drama mini series
 Giulia Doesn't Date at Night (Italian: Giulia non esce la sera), a 2009 Italian drama film
 The Legendary Giulia and Other Miracles (Italian: Noi e la Giulia), a 2015 Italian comedy film

See also 
 Giulietta (disambiguation)
 Giulio (disambiguation)
 Guilia
 Julia (disambiguation)
 Juliet (disambiguation)